Masood Shafqat is a Pakistani politician who had been a Member of the Provincial Assembly of the Punjab, from May 2013 to May 2018.

Early life and education
He was born on 1 January 1979 in Okara.

He has received intermediate level education.

Political career

He was elected to the Provincial Assembly of the Punjab as a candidate of Pakistan Tehreek-e-Insaf from Constituency PP-189 (Okara-V) in 2013 Pakistani general election.

References

Living people
Punjab MPAs 2013–2018
1979 births
Pakistan Tehreek-e-Insaf MPAs (Punjab)